Joyce Schure is a costume designer. She was nominated in the 28th Genie Awards for a Genie Award for Best Achievement in Costume Design.

Recognition 
 2008 Genie Award for Best Achievement in Costume Design - Shake Hands with the Devil - Nominee
 1992 Gemini Award for Best Costume Design - Battle of the Bulge - Nominated

External links 
 

Canadian costume designers
Year of birth missing (living people)
Living people
Canadian women in film
Women costume designers